Skhodnya was formerly a town in Moscow Oblast, Russia, located on the Skhodnya River some 12 km northwest of Moscow.  On September 15, 2004, it was merged into the city of Khimki.

Skhodnya's population was recorded at 19,119 inhabitants as of the 2002 Census; down from 20,366 recorded in the 1989 Census.  In 1974, the population stood at around 19,000.

Skhodnya was founded in 1874 and granted town status in 1961.

In 1974, a former manor house in Skhodnya was the site of a camp training Middle Eastern terrorists in the use of small arms, explosives, military tactics, and ideology.

References

Khimki
Defunct towns in Russia